Dalstorps IF is a Swedish football club located in Dalstorp.

Background
Dalstorps IF currently plays in Division 2 Västra Götaland which is the fourth tier of Swedish football. They play their home matches at the Dalshov in Dalstorp.

The club is affiliated to Västergötlands Fotbollförbund.  Dalstorps IF played in the 2011 Svenska Cupen but lost 0–1 away to Onsala BK in the preliminary round.

Season to season

In their most successful period Dalstorps IF competed in the following divisions:

In recent seasons Dalstorps IF have competed in the following divisions:

Attendances

In recent seasons Dalstorps IF have had the following average attendances:

Footnotes

External links
 Dalstorps IF – Official website
 Dalstorps IF on Facebook

Football clubs in Västra Götaland County